The Winding Stair may refer to:

 The Winding Stair (band), a musical group from Belfast, Northern Ireland
 The Winding Stair (film), a 1925 American silent drama film based on the 1923 novel
 The Winding Stair (novel), a 1923 novel by A. E. W. Mason
 The Winding Stair and Other Poems, a 1933 volume of poems by W. B. Yeats
 "The Winding Stair Mountain Blues", a 2017 song by Turnpike Troubadours from the album A Long Way from Your Heart